Down Town Mystery (Japanese: ダウン・タウン・ミステリー; stylized as DOWN TOWN MYSTERY) is the first studio album by Carlos Toshiki & Omega Tribe, released by VAP on March 9, 1988. The album peaked at #3 on the Oricon charts.

Background 
After Mitsuya Kurokawa left 1986 Omega Tribe due to health issues, and the band renamed themselves to "Carlos Toshiki & Omega Tribe" with three members.

The "Night Time" version was mixed by Kunihiko Shimizu, who was in charge of recording and mixing engineer for songs in the 1986 era, while the "Daylight" version was mixed by Eiji Uchinuma, who was newly appointed in this work. The plan to announce these two versions was planned by Koichi Fujita, the president and producer of the band's affiliated office, and thought it would be good to have separate record studios used for mixing.

During the recording stages of the single and album, Kurokawa participated with the band as well as the band's fourth tour that started in 1987. The tour was scheduled to end on January 21, 1988, but four performances were postponed due to singer Carlos Toshiki's illness. The single was released and it was announced that Kurokawa left the band.

Kurokawa also participated in the Iwate Prefectural Hall performance on March 4, 2014.

Album 
The analog version and CD are called the  "Night Time" version, and the cassette is called the "Daylight" version. The "Daylight" version has not been released as a single unit, but can be purchased separately in the iTunes Store.

In the album, vocalist Joey McCoy, who will later become a member, participates as a backup singer. Also, the original works of the members are not included in this album. When Omega Tribe moved to WEA Japan (now integrated with Warner Music Japan) in 1991, it was re-released by the company.

Although Kōji Kikkawa is mentioned in the "Special Thanks" column of the recording credit, Koji Yoshikawa is a musician who is a member of the company "Mixers Lab" to which a lot of engineers such as Kunihiko Shimizu and Eiji Uchinuma belonged to this time.

Track listing

Charts

References 

1988 debut albums
Omega Tribe (Japanese band) albums